Avianca S.A. (acronym in Spanish for Aerovias del Continente Americano S.A., "Airways of the American Continent") is Colombia's biggest  low-cost airline. It has been the flag carrier of Colombia since December 5, 1919, when it was initially registered under the name SCADTA. It is headquartered in Colombia, with its registered office in Barranquilla and its global headquarters in Bogotá and main hub at El Dorado International Airport. Avianca is the flagship of a group of ten Latin American airlines, who operate as one airline using a codesharing system. Avianca is the largest airline in Colombia and second largest in Latin America, after LATAM of Chile. Avianca and its subsidiaries have the most extensive network of destinations in Latin America. Prior to the merger with TACA in 2010, it was wholly owned by Synergy Group, a South American holding company established by Germán Efromovich and specialising in air transport. It is listed on the Colombia Stock Exchange.

Through SCADTA, Avianca is the world's second oldest extant airline after KLM, and celebrated its 100th anniversary in December 2019. It is the oldest airline in the Western Hemisphere. It became an official member of Star Alliance on June 21, 2012, after a process that lasted approximately 18 months from the initial announcement of its invitation to join the alliance. On May 10, 2020, Avianca filed for Chapter 11 bankruptcy in a court in New York City, and liquidated its subsidiary Avianca Perú, due to the COVID-19 pandemic crisis.

History

SCADTA (1919–1940)

The airline traces its history back to December 5, 1919, in the city of Barranquilla, Colombia. Colombians Ernesto Cortissoz Alvarez-Correa (the first President of the airline), Rafael María Palacio, Cristóbal Restrepo, Jacobo Correa and Aristides Noguera and Germans Werner Kämmerer, Stuart Hosie and Albert Tietjen founded the Colombo-German Company, called Sociedad Colombo-Alemana de Transportes Aéreos or SCADTA. The company accomplished their first flight on 	September 5, 1920, between Barranquilla and the nearby town of Puerto Colombia using a Junkers F.13, transporting 57 pieces of mail. The flight was piloted by German Helmuth von Krohn. This and another aircraft of the same type were completely mechanically constructed monoplanes, the engines of which had to be modified to efficiently operate in the climate of the country. Due to the topographic characteristics of the country and the lack of airports at the time, floats were adapted for two of the Junkers aircraft to make water landings in the rivers near different towns. Using these floats, Helmuth von Krohn was able to perform the first inland flight over Colombia on October 20, 1920, following the course of the Magdalena River; the flight took eight hours and required four emergency landings in the water.

Soon after the airline was founded, German scientist and philanthropist Peter von Bauer became interested in the airline and contributed general knowledge, capital and a tenth aircraft for the company, as well as obtaining concessions from the Colombian government to operate the country's airmail transportation division using the airline, which began in 1922. This new contract allowed SCADTA to thrive in a new frontier of aviation. By the mid-1920s, SCADTA started its first international routes that initially covered destinations in Venezuela and the United States. In 1924, the aircraft that both Ernesto Cortissoz and Helmuth von Krohn were flying crashed into an area currently known as Bocas de Ceniza in Barranquilla, killing them. In the early 1940s, Peter von Bauer sold his shares in the airline to the US-owned Pan Am.

National Airways of Colombia (1940–1994)

On June 14, 1940, in the city of Barranquilla, SCADTA, under ownership by United States businessmen, merged with regional Colombian airline SACO, forming the new Aerovías Nacionales de Colombia S.A. or Avianca. Five Colombians participated in this: Rafael María Palacio, Jacobo A. Corea, Cristobal Restrepo, and Aristides Noguera, as well as German citizens Albert Teitjen, Werner Kaemerer and Stuart Hosie, while the post of first President of Avianca was filled by Martín del Corral. Avianca claims SCADTA's history as its own.

In 1946, Avianca began flights to Quito, Lima, Panama City, Miami, New York City and Europe, using Douglas DC-4s and C-54 Skymasters. In 1951, Avianca acquired Lockheed Constellations and Super Constellations. In 1956, the company transported the Colombian delegation to the Melbourne Olympics on a 61-hour trip, stopping only to refuel. 

During the 1960s, the company built the Avianca Building in Bogotá, designed by the architect Germán Samper, which was inaugurated in 1969 on the south side of Santander Park. In 1961, Avianca leased two Boeing 707s to operate its international routes and on November 2, 1961, it acquired its own Boeing 720s. In 1976, Avianca became the first Latin American airline to continuously operate the Boeing 747-100. Three years later, it started operations with more 747s, including two Combi aircraft, mixing cargo and passenger operations.

In 1981, Avianca undertook the construction of a new exclusive terminal called the Terminal Puente Aéreo, which was eventually inaugurated by President Julio César Turbay Ayala. Avianca's original purpose for the terminal was for flights serving Cali, Medellín, Miami and New York.

Merger system (1994–2002)

In 1994, Avianca, the regional carrier SAM and the helicopter operator Helicol merged, beginning Avianca's new system of operations. This arrangement allowed for specialized services in cargo (Avianca Cargo) and postal services, as well as a more modern fleet made up of Boeing 767s, Boeing 757s, MD-83s, Fokker 50s, and Bell helicopters. In 1996, Avianca Postal Services became Deprisa, which provided various mail services.

On December 10, 1998, Avianca officially opened its new hub in Bogotá, offering around 6,000 possible connections per week, and an increased number of frequencies, schedules and destinations, taking advantage of the privileged geographical location of the country's capital, for the benefit of Colombian and international travelers between South America, Europe and North America.

Summa Alliance (2002–2004)
After the September 11 attacks, Avianca, SAM, and their major rival ACES joined efforts to create the Alianza Summa, which began merged operations on May 20, 2002, to offer a more efficient service, with concerns to quality, quantity, security and competition in a new struggling marketplace. However, adverse circumstances within the industry and markets, forced the alliance to be disband. In November 2003, the Alianza Summa was disbanded, ACES was liquidated altogether and SAM was acquired to be a regional carrier under Avianca's brand.

American Continent Airways (2004–2009)
On December 10, 2004, Avianca concluded a major reorganization process, undertaken after filing for Chapter 11 bankruptcy protection, by obtaining confirmation of its reorganization plan, which was financially backed by the Brazilian consortium, Synergy Group and the National Federation of Coffee Growers of Colombia, allowing the airline to obtain funds for US$63 million, in the 13 months following withdrawal from bankruptcy.

Under this plan, Avianca was bought by Synergy Group, and was consolidated with its subsidiaries OceanAir and VIP. The company's full legal name was changed from Aerovías Nacionales de Colombia (National Airways of Colombia) to Aerovías del Continente Americano (Airways of the American Continent), retaining the acronym Avianca. On February 28, 2005, Avianca presented its new logo and livery.

Avianca-TACA merger (2009–2013)

In October 2009, it was announced that Avianca would merge with TACA Airlines. This created AviancaTaca Holding, which instantly became one of the region's largest airlines, with 129 aircraft and flights to more than 100 destinations.

In November 2009, the airline's Chief Executive Fabio Villegas announced that the airline was looking to replace its Fokker 50 and Fokker 100 with newer aircraft of 100 seats or less. On January 1, 2011, the airline decided to retire the Fokker 100 in 2011 and replace them with 10 Airbus A318s leased from GECAS. The aircraft were delivered from February to April 2011.

Star Alliance
On November 10, 2010, Star Alliance announced that Avianca (and its merger counterpart, TACA) were full members in 2012. Due to Avianca's entry into Star Alliance, it ended its codeshare agreement with Delta Air Lines and began a new codeshare agreement with United Airlines. TACA had been codesharing with United Airlines since 2006. On June 21, 2012, Avianca and TACA were both officially admitted into Star Alliance.

Avianca Holdings (2013–2019)
On March 21, 2013, at the annual general meeting, the shareholders approved the change of corporate name from AviancaTaca Holding to Avianca Holdings. TACA and all other AviancaTaca airlines changed their brand to Avianca on May 28, 2013.

As of 2017, Avianca operates the second-most daily international flights from Miami with 16, second only to American Airlines.

In August 2018, Avianca had some operational difficulties due to problems with the platform it used to assign crew schedules. This resulted in the cancellation of several flights within Colombia. Likewise, due to the stoppage of ACDAC pilots in 2017, only in October 2018 were all flight itineraries managed by the airline restored.

On March 1, 2019, Avianca launched a subsidiary named Avianca Express, which operates ATR-72s on short regional flights within Colombia.

2020 bankruptcy (2020-2021)

Avianca had significant financial liabilities in 2019. Because of this, they issued more debt to cover short-term liabilities and concluded a debt exchange on December 31, 2019. In response to the global outbreak of COVID-19, the Colombian government's lockdown suspended Avianca's domestic and international operations; most of the company’s 20,000 employees went without pay throughout this period, and the airline operated no scheduled passenger flights between late March and May outside of repatriation missions. As a result of this temporary cessation of business, the company had seen 80% of its revenue stopped.

Avianca Holdings and 23 affiliated debtors filed for Chapter 11 bankruptcy in the United States District Court for the Southern District of New York on May 10, 2020, as a direct result of the COVID-19 pandemic and subsequent global shutdown, and their financial situation prior to and during the crisis. The airline holding liquidated their subsidiary Avianca Perú the same day. The debtors were granted joint administration of the cases under Case No. 20-11133. The airline had accumulated a total debt of USD $7.3 billion at the end of 2019.

Avianca implemented numerous cost-reduction plans during and following their bankruptcy including increasing the passenger capacity and redesigning the cabin of their Airbus A320s, simplifying their fleet to only the A320 family and Boeing 787, the latter of which will also feature an economy class cabin redesign, and introducing new, cheaper, and more competitive fares with increased options for flexibility including checked and carry-on bags, seat selection, and priority boarding.

In November 2021, Avianca Holdings announced they would move their legal address from Panama to the United Kingdom, and that they would change their name to Avianca Group. Their global headquarters remains in Bogotá. On November 2, 2021, Avianca's reorganization plan was approved by the court, and on December 1, 2021, more than a year and a half after filing, Avianca emerged from Chapter 11 bankruptcy for the second time in its history.

Abra Group and merger with Viva Air (2022-present)

In April 2022, Avianca announced plans to acquire low-cost competitor Viva Air Colombia and its subsidiary Viva Air Perú. The merger was rejected by the Colombian Civil Aviation Authority in November 2022.

On May 11, 2022, it was announced that Avianca planned to merge with Viva Air Colombia, Viva Air Peru, and Gol Linhas Aéreas Inteligentes to form the Abra Group, and that Avianca would be the acquiring company. Avianca has stated that the rejection of the Avianca-Viva Air merger would not affect the plans for the Abra Group. 

In September 2022, Ecuador's Superintendency for the Control of Market Power became the first government body to approve the merger. In December 2022, Avianca stated that they had reached all necessary agreements for the group bar "certain financing", and that they had obtained approval from regulatory bodies in Brazil and the United States. Avianca also stated that they do not need regulatory approval in Colombia because GOL has no presence in the country, and hence there would be no overlap in Colombia.

On January 19, 2023, the Ministry of Transport and Aerocivil formally annulled the November 2022 decision to reject the Avianca-Viva Air merger, citing "procedural irregularities" found within the first review process. A second review is due to take place in "an urgent manner", owing to the fact that the merger proposal was filed under "exception for a company in crisis", referencing Viva Air's financial situation.

Headquarters

Avianca's headquarters are on Avenida El Dorado and between Carrera 60 and Gobernación de Cundinamarca, located in the Ciudad Salitre area of Bogotá. The building is located next to the Gran Estación. Its previous head office was at Avenida El Dorado No. 93-30.

Destinations

Avianca's hubs are in Bogotá, and San Salvador. Its focus cities are Medellin, Cali, Barranquilla, San José, and Miami, in the latter of which Avianca is the largest foreign carrier by number of passengers.

Subsidiaries

Codeshare agreements
Avianca has codeshare agreements with the following airlines:

Aeroméxico
Air Canada
Air China
Air India
All Nippon Airways
Avianca El Salvador
Azul Brazilian Airlines
Copa Airlines
Cubana de Aviación
EasyFly
Etihad Airways
EVA Air
Gol Linhas Aéreas Inteligentes
Iberia
ITA Airways
Lufthansa
Silver Airways
Singapore Airlines
TAP Air Portugal
Turkish Airlines
United Airlines

Interline agreement
Avianca has an interline agreement with Boliviana de Aviación.

LifeMiles
The frequent-flyer program of Avianca and its subsidiaries is LifeMiles. This program is designed to reward customer loyalty for the airline, travel and retail sectors. LifeMiles members can earn miles every time they fly with Avianca, Star Alliance member airlines, as well as GOL Airlines, Aeromexico and Iberia. 

The program was launched in 2011 with the merger of Avianca and TACA, replacing its former AviancaPlus program. LifeMiles has been awarded 14 Freddie Awards for its outstanding performance and promotions in the Americas during the last 9 years.

LifeMiles has four elite tiers:
Red Plus (Star Alliance Silver)
Silver (Star Alliance Silver)
Gold (Star Alliance Gold)
Diamond (Star Alliance Gold)

Fleet

Current fleet

, the Avianca fleet consists of the following aircraft:

Avianca's first Boeing 787 Dreamliner was delivered on December 17, 2014, and its first service was on January 16, 2015, between Bogotá and New York City.

Former fleet
Since its founding, Avianca has operated a wide variety of aircraft:

Accidents and incidents
The airline suffered a few incidents during the 1980s and early 1990s. The deadliest of those incidents was Avianca Flight 011, which crashed in 1983.

On January 22, 1947, a Douglas C-53B (registered C-108), crashed in the Magdalena river valley, killing all 17 people on board.
On August 9, 1954, a Lockheed L-749A (registered HK-163), crashed three minutes after takeoff from Lajes Field, Azores, after it flew left into the hills instead of right towards the sea. All 30 on board died.
On March 9, 1955, a Douglas C-47A (registered HK-328), crashed at Trujillo, Colombia, killing all eight on board. The wreckage was found a month later, but some of the gold and cargo was missing.
On June 23, 1959, a Douglas DC-4 (registered HK-135), operating as Flight 667, struck Cerro Baco mountain while en route to Lima, Peru, killing all 14 aboard.
On January 21, 1960, Avianca Flight 671, a Lockheed L-1049E, crashed and burned on landing at Sangster International Airport in Jamaica, killing 37 aboard.
The cause was the decision of the pilot to fly VFR in conditions that required IFR.
On January 15, 1966, Avianca Flight 4 crashed shortly after takeoff from Rafael Núñez International Airport. The cause was determined to be maintenance problems, possibly compounded by pilot error.
On September 22, 1966, a Douglas DC-4 (registered HK-174), and operating Flight 870, crashed while attempting to return to Eldorado Airport due to engine problems, killing both pilots. The cause was traced to a failure in the governor control unit. Improper supervision by the company was a contributing factor, as the pilot was briefed to make a night flight while he was in conversion training for the L-749.
On December 24, 1966, a Douglas C-47A, (registered HK-161), operating Flight 729, struck Cerro Las Animas at an elevation of  while approaching Pasto, killing all 29 on board. A combination of poor CRM, pilot intoxication, deviation from route, and pilot error was cited as the cause.
On May 21, 1970, a Douglas DC-3, (registered HK-121), was hijacked to Yariguíes Airport, Barrancabermeja whilst on a flight from El Alcaraván Airport, Yopal to Alberto Lleras Camargo Airport, Sogamoso. The hijackers had demanded to be taken to Cuba.
On July 29, 1972, two Douglas C-53s, registered HK-107 and HK-1341, were involved in a mid-air collision over the Las Palomas Mountains. Both aircraft crashed, killing 21 people on HK-107 and 17 people on HK-1341. Both aircraft were operating domestic scheduled passenger flights from La Vanguardia Airport, Villavicencio to El Alcaraván Airport, Yopal.
On August 22, 1973, a Douglas DC-3A (registered HK-111), crashed into a hill near the Casanare Department, killing 16 of the 17 people on board. The aircraft was operating a domestic scheduled passenger flight from La Vanguardia Airport, Villavicencio to El Alcaraván Airport, Yopal.
On August 12, 1974, a Douglas C-47 (registered HK-508), flew into Trujillo Mountain, killing all 27 people on board. The aircraft was on a domestic scheduled passenger flight from El Dorado Airport, Bogotá to La Florida Airport, Tumaco.
On November 27, 1983, Avianca Flight 011, a Boeing 747-200M (registered HK-2910X) crashed into a mountain just short of landing at Madrid Barajas Airport in Madrid, killing 181 of the 192 people aboard. The cause was determined to be pilot error.
On March 17, 1988, Avianca Flight 410, a Boeing 727-100 (registered HK-1716) crashed into low mountains near Cúcuta - Norte de Santander Department after take-off, killing all 143 on board. It was determined that pilot error was also the cause of this crash, in a situation similar to Flight 011.
On November 27, 1989, a bomb destroyed Avianca Flight 203. All 110 passengers and crew were killed. The bombing had been ordered by Pablo Escobar to kill presidential candidate César Gaviria Trujillo. In the aftermath, it was discovered that Gaviria had not boarded the aircraft.
On January 25, 1990, Avianca Flight 052, a Boeing 707-320C (registered HK-2016) en route from Bogotá to New York City via Medellín crashed in Cove Neck, New York, after running out of fuel while in a holding pattern for at New York's John F. Kennedy International Airport, killing 73 of the 158 people aboard.
On April 26, 1990, 19th of April Movement presidential candidate Carlos Pizarro was gunned down during a domestic Avianca flight.
On April 12, 1999, Avianca Flight 9463, a Fokker 50 (registered PH-MXT), from Bogotá to Bucaramanga was hijacked by six ELN members, who forced the plane to make an emergency landing on a clandestine runway in the Bolívar Department. One passenger died during captivity, the rest were eventually liberated a year after the hijacking.

Awards and recognitions
In its recent history, the company has won different awards:

2010: E-Commerce Company of the Year – eCommerce Awards Colombia.
2012: Best Company in Customer Service Labor and Management – Ibero-American Social Media Awards.
2013: Best Company in Customer Service Labor and Management – Ibero-American Social Media Awards.
2013: South American Airlines with Best Onboard Service – Skytrax World Airline Awards.
2014: Best E-commerce Initiative in Colombia – Colombia Online Awards.
2015: Best Airline in South America – World Travel Awards.
2016: Best Airline in South America and Latin America – Business Traveler North America Magazine.
2017: Best Airline in South America – Business Traveler Awards.
2017: Best Airline in South America and Best Regional Airline in South America – Skytrax World Airline Awards.
2017: Best Mobile Initiative for eCommerce – eCommerce Awards.
2017: Second-best airline in the world – Consumers and Users Organization.
2018: Best Airline in South America – Skytrax World Airline Awards.
2018: Best Regional Airline in South America – Airline Passenger Experience APEX.

See also
List of airlines of Colombia

References

External links

  
September 2012 Issue of Explore Taca

 
1919 establishments in Colombia
Airlines established in 1919
Airlines of Colombia
Colombian brands
Companies based in Bogotá
Companies listed on the Colombia Stock Exchange
Companies that filed for Chapter 11 bankruptcy in 2004
Companies that filed for Chapter 11 bankruptcy in 2020
Latin American and Caribbean Air Transport Association
Multinational companies headquartered in Colombia
Star Alliance